Allan Lindsay Briggs (February 14, 1873 – November 12, 1951) was an American sport shooter who competed in the 1912 Summer Olympics.

In 1912 he won the gold medal as member of the American team in the team military rifle competition. In the 1912 Summer Olympics he also participated in the following events:

 600 metre free rifle – fourth place
 300 metre military rifle, three positions – 25th place
 300 metre free rifle, three positions – 35th place

He was born in Bridgeport, Connecticut, and died in Vineyard Haven, Massachusetts.

References

External links
 
 

1873 births
1951 deaths
American male sport shooters
United States Distinguished Marksman
Burials at Arlington National Cemetery
ISSF rifle shooters
Olympic gold medalists for the United States in shooting
Olympic medalists in shooting
Sportspeople from Bridgeport, Connecticut
Shooters at the 1912 Summer Olympics
Medalists at the 1912 Summer Olympics